Kotes (feminine: Kotesová) is a surname of German origin and the 727,710th
most common
surname in the world, which is common in Slovakia and Czech Republic. It came from German Gottes, which in English means "gods".

Approximately 397 people around the world bear this surname. In 1995 224 people in Slovakia bear the surname, in 2014 it was only 135 and in 2016 26 people bear the surname in Czech Republic.

References 

Slovak-language surnames
Surnames of German origin